Arunachal Pradesh Congress Committee (or Arunachal PCC) is the wing of Indian National Congress serving in Arunachal Pradesh

The President is Nabam Tuki.

Arunachal Pradesh Legislative Assembly election

See also
 Indian National Congress
 Congress Working Committee
 All India Congress Committee
 Pradesh Congress Committee

References

External links

Indian National Congress by state or union territory
Politics of Arunachal Pradesh